Wabash Township is one of thirteen townships in Tippecanoe County, Indiana, United States. As of the 2010 census, its population was 59,279 and it contained 21,448 housing units making it the most populous township in Tippecanoe County.

Geography
Wabash Township encompasses all but a small section of the City of West Lafayette and encompasses all of Purdue University making it one of the most culturally diverse townships in the United States.

Cities, towns, villages
 West Lafayette (vast majority)

Neighborhoods and former and unincorporated communities
 Bar Barry Heights at 
 Crumb Corner at 
 Green Meadows at 
 Indian Village at 
 Klondike at 
 McQuinn Estates at 
 Octagon at 
 Ravinamy at 
 Summit at 
 Wabash Shores at 
(This list is based on USGS data and may include former settlements.)

Adjacent townships
 Prairie Township, White County (northeast)
 Tippecanoe Township (northeast)
 Fairfield Township (southeast)
 Union Township (south)
 Wayne Township (southwest)
 Shelby Township (west)
 Round Grove Township, White County (northwest)

Cemeteries
The township contains five cemeteries: Grandview, Hebron, Indiana State Soldiers' Home, Sand Ridge and Tippecanoe Memory Gardens.

Major highways
  US Route 52
  US Route 231
  Indiana State Road 43

Airports
 Purdue University Airport

Lakes
 Hadley Lake
 Celery Bog Nature Area

Landmarks
 Purdue University
 C-SPAN Archives
 Fort Ouiatenon A former French trading post built in the early 1700s.
 Samara House - Samara is a house designed by Frank Lloyd Wright.
 Indiana State Soldiers Home Historic District, Levi and Lucy Morehouse Farm, and James Pierce Jr. House are listed on the National Register of Historic Places.

News and Media
 WLFI-TV is a CBS affiliate owned by LIN Media.
 WBAA is a radio station owned by Purdue University.
 Purdue Exponent is a daily independent student run newspaper.

School districts
 Tippecanoe School Corporation
 West Lafayette Community School Corporation

Political districts
 Indiana's 4th congressional district
 State House District 26
 State House District 27
 State Senate District 22

Township Officials

Township Trustee
Angel Valentin

Township Board
Brendan Betz
David Tate
Vacant (pending Democratic caucus to fill position vacated by Angel Valentin)

Trustee Teising's Residency Violation and Criminal Conviction
Jennifer Teising, running as a Democrat, was elected to a four-year term as township Trustee in the 2018 general election. Almost immediately upon taking office, she replaced the existing fire chief. She then spearheaded an effort to take a series of emergency loans, funded by increased property taxes, in order to fund fire department improvements including the hiring of additional firefighters and the provision of benefits to paid fire department staff. Teising failed to gain public support for her plan to gain long-term funding for the fire department improvements, and instead, in a series of moves that were opposed by the township advisory board, fired the Fire Chief for alleged subordination and the township's three full-time firefighters due to lack of funding, leaving much of the emergency loan money unspent. 

Public records showed that in early 2020, Teising sold her home and updated her voter registration to reflect a primary residency at an address elsewhere within the township. A investigative report by the local newspaper in December 2020 found that after the sale of her house, Teising had spent substantial time outside the township, and at the time of the investigation was living at an RV park in Florida.

On January 29, 2021, Indiana State Police served a search warrant on the Trustee's office, and Teising later revealed she was being investigated for violating the residency requirement of her elected office. On May 12, 2021, a grand jury indicted Teising on 20 felony counts of theft for continuing to draw paychecks without meeting the residency requirement of the position from June 17, 2020, through March 26, 2021. A grand jury later indicted Teising on an additional felony charge of theft for allegedly improperly continuing to draw a paycheck during the period of April through June 2021. She denied the allegations and revealed plans to sue Prosecutor Harrington for malicious prosecution. After motions by the defense that a special prosecutor be assigned and that the trial be moved outside the county were denied, Teising waived her right to jury trial, citing a lack of confidence in being able to seat an impartial jury in Tippecanoe County.

Trustee Teising's bench trial was held from Dec 13, 2021 to Dec 15, 2021 with Judge Kristen McVey presiding. The prosecution presented evidence that during the 10 months in question, Teising stayed overnight in the township just 27 nights, and that she had packages delivered, paid utilities, and signed a 6-month rental agreement at addresses outside the township. Multiple witnesses testified that in early 2020, Teising had revealed plans to leave office prior to the end of her elected term and move to Florida. The defense argued that although Teising traveled extensively outside the township, including extended stays in Florida, she maintained a legal residence in the township at the address of a former boyfriend. On January 5, 2022, Judge McVey convicted Teising on all 21 felony counts of theft, citing a failure by Teising to "make her true, permanent, and fixed home in Wabash Township" and her actions that "evince[d] a desire to conceal her actual whereabouts." As dictated by state law, the felony conviction resulted in the trustee's immediate removal from office. She was later sentenced to 124 days in jail, 124 days in community detention, and 2.5 years in probation, and was ordered to pay restitution for the illegal paychecks. The combined 248 days of detention corresponded to the 248 days she was ruled to have lived outside the township.

References
 United States Census Bureau 2007 TIGER/Line Shapefiles
 United States Board on Geographic Names (GNIS)
 United States National Atlas

External links
 Indiana Township Association
 United Township Association of Indiana
 Wabash Township Fire Department

Townships in Tippecanoe County, Indiana
Lafayette metropolitan area, Indiana
Townships in Indiana